Tirso Hernández (13 August 1892 – 9 December 1985) was a Mexican sports shooter. He competed in the 25 m rapid fire pistol event at the 1924 Summer Olympics. Hernández was also the President of the Mexican Olympic Committee from 1929 to 1951.

References

External links
 

1893 births
1985 deaths
Mexican male sport shooters
Olympic shooters of Mexico
Shooters at the 1924 Summer Olympics
People from Rioverde, San Luis Potosí